Petrus Jurgen Visser  (born 13 September 1989) is a South African rugby union footballer whose usual position is full back.

References

External links

Bulls profile
itsrugby profile
NTT Docomo Profile
Kamaishi Seawaves

Living people
1989 births
South African rugby union players
Rugby union fullbacks
Bulls (rugby union) players
Blue Bulls players
Western Province (rugby union) players
Sportspeople from Paarl
Afrikaner people
South African people of Dutch descent
Stellenbosch University alumni
Alumni of Paarl Gimnasium
Southern Kings players
Rugby union players from the Western Cape